Antonio Bustamante (born June 20, 1997) is a Bolivian footballer who plays as a midfielder for Danish 2nd Division club B.93. Born in the United States, Bustamante represents the Bolivia national team.

Career

D.C. United 
On January 21, 2019, Antonio signed a homegrown contract with D.C. United. Antonio had his first start for D.C. against the Philadelphia Union on June 12, 2019 in a U.S. Open Cup match. After the 2019 season, D.C. United did not exercise Bustamante's contract option.

Loudoun United 
Bustamante was loaned to D.C. United's USL team, Loudoun United before their inaugural season. Bustamante was rewarded Man of the Match after scoring one goal and assisting a goal against Louisville City FC on July 28, 2019. He played 2,133 minutes in his one season with Loudoun.

Club Blooming 
Bustamante joined Club Blooming in March 2020.

Club Náutico Capibaribe 
In 2020, Bustamante was loaned out to Club Náutico Capibaribe.

Thisted FC
On 11 September 2021, Bustamante joined Danish 2nd Division club Thisted FC. Bustamente left the Danish club at the end of 2022.

B.93
On transfer deadline day, 31 January 2023, Bustamente joined another Danish 2nd Division club, B.93.

International career
Bustamante was called up by César Farías to play with the Bolivia national under-23 football team in the 2020 CONMEBOL Pre-Olympic Tournament.  Bustamante made his first international appearance as a substitute in the 60th minute of the opening match against Paraguay's own U23 side.  

On 9 October 2020, Bustamante debuted for the senior Bolivia national team in a 5-0 2022 FIFA World Cup qualification loss to Brazil.

References

External links
Profile at D.C. United

1997 births
Living people
People from Springfield, Virginia
Sportspeople from Fairfax County, Virginia
People with acquired Bolivian citizenship
Bolivian footballers
Bolivian expatriate footballers
Bolivia international footballers
Bolivia youth international footballers
American soccer players
American expatriate soccer players
American people of Bolivian descent
Association football midfielders
D.C. United players
Loudoun United FC players
Clube Náutico Capibaribe players
Soccer players from Virginia
USL Championship players
Thisted FC players
Boldklubben af 1893 players
Danish 2nd Division players
William & Mary Tribe men's soccer players
Homegrown Players (MLS)
American expatriate sportspeople in Denmark
Expatriate men's footballers in Denmark